Shadow of the Wolf (French title: Agaguk) is a 1992 Canadian-French adventure film directed by Jacques Dorfmann and Pierre Magny and starring Lou Diamond Phillips, Toshiro Mifune, Jennifer Tilly, and Donald Sutherland. It is based on the novel Agaguk by Yves Thériault.

Plot
Agaguk has become isolated from his fellow Inuit after he was disowned by his father, the angakkuq (shaman), Kroomak, for challenging the latter's chosen wife.  Brown, a white man, comes to do business in the territory.  Agakuk is forced to go on the run after a dramatic altercation with Brown and flee from the pursuing police, impacting the stability of his community.

Cast 
 Lou Diamond Phillips as Agaguk
 Toshiro Mifune as  Kroomak
 Jennifer Tilly as  Igiyook
 Bernard-Pierre Donnadieu as  Brown
 Donald Sutherland  as  Henderson
 Nicholas Campbell  as Scott
 Raoul Trujillo	as Big Tooth
 Qalingo Tookalak	 as Tulugak
 Jobie Arnaituk	 as Nayalik
 Tamussie Sivuarapik	 as Korok
 Harry Hill      as Mr. Tavish

Production
Principal photography for the film took place at Montreal, Quebec, Canada.

References

External links 

1990s adventure films
French adventure films
Canadian adventure films
English-language Canadian films
English-language French films
Films scored by Maurice Jarre
1990s English-language films
1990s Canadian films
1990s French films